Todo un hombre (What a Man) is a 1943 Argentine romantic drama film directed by Pierre Chenal on his Latin film debut, and starring Francisco Petrone
and Amelia Bence. Critically acclaimed, the film was compared by critics in Argentina to Jean Vigo's L'Atalante. At the 1944 Argentine Film Critics Association Awards, Petrone won the Silver Condor Award for Best Actor for his performance in the film.

Plot
Francisco Petrone is a tough, hard-working independent river man, who finds it difficult to communicate and express his true feeling to his young wife (Amelia Bence). The two travel up a winding river, and tension between the two escalates.

Cast
Francisco Petrone
Amelia Bence
Nicolás Fregues
Florindo Ferrario
Guillermo Battaglia
Ana Arneodo
Tilda Thamar
Renée Sutil
Leticia Scuri
Carlos Belluci

References

External links
 

1943 films
1940s Spanish-language films
Argentine black-and-white films
Films directed by Pierre Chenal
Argentine romantic drama films
1943 romantic drama films
1940s Argentine films